The Batu Pahat River is the river originating from Sungai Simpang Kiri and Sungai Simpang Kanan (in which the river split as Sungai Bekok and Sungai Sembrong in Tanjung Sembrong) near Tongkang Pechah, and flows through Batu Pahat (Bandar Penggaram) and until it reaches the mouth of the river in Pantai Minyak Beku, a seaside village lying on the west coast of Johor, Malaysia.

The total length of the river is 12 km.

See also
 Geography of Malaysia

References

Batu Pahat District
Rivers of Johor